"Miss Movin' On" is the debut single by American girl group Fifth Harmony. It was written by Mitch Allan, Jason Evigan, Lindy Robbins, Julia Michaels, Alo Tamposi with production handled by Allan and Evigan. The song was released on July 16, 2013 as the lead single from the group's debut extended play Better Together. Musically, the song is a power pop track with a synth-backed chorus and soaring hooks. In its lyrics, the group expresses a message of empowerment after the end of a relationship.

"Miss Movin On" became the group's first song to debut on the Billboard Hot 100, while also entering its pop counterpart chart and in New Zealand. The song's accompanying music video, directed by Hannah Lux Davis and shot on-site in San Diego, California at the Del Mar Fairgrounds features the girls enjoying themselves at an amusement park after getting over the break-ups of their boyfriends. The group performed the song several times, including on televised programs such as The Today Show, Fox & Friends, and  Live! with Kelly and Michael.

Background and release
The main producer of Fifth Harmony's debut extended play, Julian Bunetta, stated on Twitter that two singles from the album would be released during June 2013. On June 4, 2013, Fifth Harmony tweeted that there would be an upcoming announcement related to the single and on June 7 the group announced via a Vine video that the debut single is called "Miss Movin' On". Fifth Harmony released a short preview of the song on Twitter.

Composition
"Miss Movin' On" is a power pop song that lasts for three minutes and 14 seconds. Its written in the key of F major and is set in the time signature of  common time with a moderate tempo of 76 beats per minute. Songwriting and production is largely based on previous The Suspex productions, most notably Demi Lovato's "Heart Attack" which shows similar explosive chorus, huge vocals and soaring hooks.

The song begins guitar chords Camila Cabello and Lauren Jauregui belt out the song's first verses with the chord progression of F–C–Dm, followed by the explosive synth-backed chorus. Its bridge has a beat comparable to English rock band Queen's single, "We Will Rock You". Lyrically, the song express a message of empowerment after the end of a relationship.

Reception

Critical reception
Jessica Sager from PopCrush gave the song 4.5 out of 5 stars, praising the group's vocals as having "a hefty dose of soul that many of their Top 40 contemporaries, most of whom are a lot older than they are, lack." Christina Lee, from Idolator called the song "explosive". Lee also noted the equal distribution in vocals, saying the group "exchanged the vocals in a way that each member is heard, but in subtle and unexpected ways".

In a positive review, Jenna Rubenstein wrote on the MTV blog that "we effing loving it" and also complimented the single's "shiny, polished pop beat" and lyrics. Examiner and Billboard named the single a "pop kiss-off anthem", with Billboard writing that the "empowering track fulfills the group's promise of "fun pop". Bill Lamb of About shared similar sentiments and noted that the group is trying to create a popularity for "girl groups", and praises the song for containing a powerful ballad that influences the chorus.

Samantha Martin from PopDust praised the group's "distinct voices", as they "blend seamlessly when singing". The Portuguese website Original Tune praised the song for "undoubtedly" making the "most complete of an artist revealed by X-Factor US". He continued his review by complementing the "production" as the producers "took great care" not to make the song sound "too generic". Bradley Stern of MuuMuse gave the song four out of five stars calling the song a "power-pop empowerment anthem". Stern also praised the "huge vocals", "soaring hooks" and the "fists-aloft, fuck-off chorus." Sugarscape compared the track to Demi Lovato's songs.

Commercial performance
During the single's first chart tracking week, it sold 37,000 digital downloads and had 489,000 streams in the United States, debuting at number 85 on the Billboard Hot 100. On August 15, the song re-entered the chart, at a new peak of 83. It then peaked at number 76., and spent eleven weeks on the chart. On the Mainstream Top 40 chart, it peaked at number 27, spending nine weeks there. The song also charted on the Billboard Heatseekers Songs at number four, spending five weeks on the chart.

Outside of the United States, "Miss Movin' On" charted at number 27 in New Zealand, becoming the group's first top 40 entry as part of their debut single.

Music video
After releasing the lyric video for the single on June 18, 2013, the music video was posted on Kaskade's official YouTube account on July 15, 2013. Directed by Hannah Lux Davis, the video shows the five girls enjoying themselves at an amusement park together, all of them having recently gotten over their break-ups with their boyfriends.  Throughout the video the girls are seen singing into vintage microphones. The music video was filmed in Del Mar, California at the San Diego County Fair

The group became the first alumnae from the American version of The X Factor to reach 15 million YouTube views for an original song, when the "Disarm You" ft. Ilsey" video surpassed this feat on October 20, 2013. Since then, the video became the group's fourth Vevo certification for reaching over 100 million views. As of July 2022, the video was nearing 175 million views.

Live performances
The group performed "Miss Movin' On" for the first time on television on July 18, 2013, on The Today Show in New York City. While visiting radio stations as part of the single's promotion, the group sung acoustic versions of the song on KIIS FM and Radio Disney. The song was on the set list for the group's mall tour titled Harmonize America and Cher Lloyd's I Wish Tour throughout September 2013, where Fifth Harmony was the opening act.

Other performances of the song include Fox & Friends, The Arsenio Hall Show, and Live! with Kelly and Michael.  and at the 2014 Radio Disney Music Awards.

Track listings

Digital download (Album version)
"Miss Movin' On" – 3:14

CD single
"Miss Movin' On" – 3:14
"Me & My Girls" – 3:24

Miss Movin' On (Papercha$er Remix)
"Miss Movin' On" (Papercha$er Remix) - 4:07

Credits and personnel
Management
Credits adapted from Better Togethers liner notes.

Recording and management
 Recorded at The Guest House Studios (Los Angeles, California)
 Mixed at MixStar Studios (Virginia Beach, Virginia)
Published by BMG Platinum Songs and Bad Robot (BMI), Hey Kiddo Music. (ASCAP).

Personnel

Ally Brooke - vocals
Camila Cabello - vocals
Dinah Jane - vocals
Lauren Jauregui - vocals
Normani Kordei - vocals
Jason Evigan – songwriter, production, programming

Lindy Robbins - songwriter
Julia Michaels - songwriter
Mitch Allan - songwriter
Dan Book - vocal producer
Serban Ghenea – mixing
John Hanes – mixing engineer

Charts and certifications

Weekly charts

Certifications

Release history

References

External links
 
 
 
 

2013 songs
Fifth Harmony songs
Syco Music singles
Epic Records singles
2013 debut singles
American power pop songs
Music videos directed by Hannah Lux Davis
Songs written by Mitch Allan
Songs written by Ali Tamposi
Songs written by Lindy Robbins
Songs written by Jason Evigan
Songs written by Julia Michaels